Grizzly is the fifteenth novel in World of Adventure series by Gary Paulsen.  It was published on October 6, 1997 by Random House.

Plot
The story is about Justin McCallister who loves life on his aunt and uncle's sheep ranch in Montana. Until a grizzly bear begins terrorizing the livestock, injuring Justin's collie, Radar, and killing his pet lamb, Blue.

Publication
It was later turned into a two part omnibus along with Danger on Midnight River by Macmillan and released in February, 1999.

1997 American novels
1997 children's books
American young adult novels
Novels by Gary Paulsen
Books about bears
Children's novels about animals
Novels set in Montana
Grizzly bears in popular culture